Taganak may refer to:
Taganak Island, the largest of the seven Philippine Turtle Islands
Taqanak, a city in Iran
USS Taganak (AG-45), a ship